T. polymorpha may refer to:

 Tabebuia polymorpha, a plant endemic to Cuba
 Tectaria polymorpha, a leptosporangiate fern
 Trichosarcina polymorpha, a green alga